Caltoris cahira, the colon swift, is a species of skipper butterfly found in Asia. It mainly found in the forest area of south Asian countries like Bangladesh, India, etc. Like other swifts, it flies very fast and darts all around. Sometime it basks with its wings spread.

Description

Seen in the south Andaman Islands. A related species is found in northeastern India (Sikkim) and is sometimes considered a subspecies Caltoris cahira austeni.

Caltoris
Fauna of Pakistan
Butterflies of Asia
Butterflies of Indochina